Juvigné is a commune in the Mayenne department in north-western France.

It is located on the borders of Normandy, Brittany and the northern Loire, it is predominantly an agricultural region known for its cattle rearing. The village is also known locally for being one of the prettiest in the region and is named the 'Village of Flowers' after its summer foral displays. It is also home to a small farming museum, and there is an impressive neo-classical church, presbytery and historic former school building in the village.

See also
Communes of the Mayenne department

References

Communes of Mayenne